Thomas Frederick William Inns (30 January 1911 – 1987) was a footballer who played as full back.

Career
Inns began his senior career with amateur side Clapton, before signing for Second Division club West Ham United. Inns made his debut for West Ham on 26 December 1933, in a 1–1 draw against Swansea Town. Inns would make three more appearances for West Ham, before dropping down to the reserves. In 1936, along with West Ham teammate Dave Mangnall, Inns signed for rivals Millwall.

On 31 August 1936, Inns made his debut for Millwall, in a 2–0 home win against Queens Park Rangers. Despite missing the opening day of the season two days prior, Inns would go on to play all 47 of Millwall's remaining games, as the club reached the FA Cup semi-finals for the third time in the club's history. Inns' last appearance for Millwall would come on 5 November 1938, in a 1–0 loss against Southampton.

References

1911 births
1987 deaths
Footballers from Plaistow, Newham
English footballers
Association football defenders
Clapton F.C. players
West Ham United F.C. players
Millwall F.C. players
English Football League players